The following were the scheduled events of association football for the year 2018 throughout the world.

Events

Men's national teams 
 31 May – 10 June: 2018 ConIFA World Football Cup for non-FIFA nations in  England
: 
: 
: 
4th: 
 14 June – 15 July: 2018 FIFA World Cup in  Russia
: 
: 
: 
4th:

AFC
 22–25 March: 2018 King's Cup in  Thailand
: 
: 
: 
4th: 
 22–26 March: 2018 China Cup in  Nanning
: 
: 
: 
4th: 
 22–27 March: 2018 International Friendship Championship in  Iraq
: 
: 
: 
 1–10 June: 2018 Intercontinental Cup in  India.
: 
: 
: 
4th: 
 4–15 September: 2018 SAFF Championship in  Bangladesh
: 
: 
 8 November – 15 December: 2018 AFF Championship
: 
:

CAF
13 January – 4 February: 2018 African Nations Championship in  Morocco (for players from national championships only)
 : 
 : 
 : 
 4th: 
 22–24 March: 2018 Four Nations Tournament in  Zambia
: 
: 
: 
4th:

UEFA
6 September – 20 November: 2018–19 UEFA Nations League (pool stage)

Youth 
9–27 January: 2018 AFC U-23 Championship in  China
 : 
 : 
 : 
 4th: 
24 April – 5 May: 2018 WAFU Zone A U-20 Tournament in   Liberia
 : 
 : 
 : 
 4th: 
4–20 May: 2018 UEFA European Under-17 Championship in  England
 : 
 : 
2–14 July: 2018 AFF U-19 Youth Championship in  Indonesia
 : 
 : 
 : 
 4th: 
16–29 July: 2018 UEFA European Under-19 Championship in  Finland
 : 
 : 
19 July – 3 August: 2018 Central American and Caribbean Games (under-21) in  Colombia
 : 
 : 
 : 
 4th: 
29 July – 11 August: 2018 AFF U-16 Youth Championship in  Indonesia
 : 
 : 
 : 
 4th: 
18 August – 2 September: 2018 Asian Games (under-23) in  Indonesia
 : 
 : 
 : 
 4th: 
20 September – 7 October: 2018 AFC U-16 Championship in  Malaysia
 : 
 : 
18 October – 4 November: 2018 AFC U-19 Championship in  Indonesia
 : 
 : 
30 November – 13 December: 2018 COSAFA U-20 Cup in 
 : 
 : 
 : 
 4th: 
6 – 16 December: WAFU UFOA B U20 Championship in 
 : 
 : 
 : 
 4th:

Women's
10–24 February: 2018 WAFU Women's Cup in  Ivory Coast (regional)
: 
: 
: 
4th: 
4–22 April: 2018 Copa América Femenina in  Chile
: 
: 
: 
4th: 
6–20 April: 2018 AFC Women's Asian Cup in  Jordan
: 
: 
: 
4th: 
18–29 April: 2018 CFU Women's Challenge Series
Group A Winner: 
Group B Winner: 
Group C Winner: 
Group D Winner: 
Group E Winner: 
16–31 August: 2018 Asian Games in  Indonesia
: 
: 
: 
4th: 
4–17 October 2018 CONCACAF Women's Championship
:  
: 
: 
4th: 
17 November – 1 December: 2018 Africa Women Cup of Nations in  Ghana
: 
: 
: 
4th: 
17 November – 1 December: 2018 OFC Women's Nations Cup in  New Caledonia
: 
: 
: 
4th: 
23 November – 1 December: 2018 CAFA Women's Championship in 
: 
: 
: 
4th: 
International tournaments
26 February – 6 March: 2018 Turkish Women’s Cup in 
:  B
: 
: 
4th: 
28 February – 7 March: 2018 Cyprus Women's Cup in 
:  
: 
: 
4th: 
28 February – 7 March: 2018 Algarve Cup in 
:  and  
: 
4th: 
The final game was called off due to heavy rain and adverse weather conditions. Both The Netherlands and Sweden were awarded first place.
 1–7 March: 2018 SheBelieves Cup in the 
:  
: 
: 
4th: 
 26 July – 2 August: 2018 Tournament of Nations in the 
:  
: 
: 
4th:

Women's youth
13–31 January: 2018 South American Under-20 Women's Football Championship in  Ecuador
 : 
 : 
 : 
 4th: 
18–28 January: 2018 CONCACAF Women's U-20 Championship in  Trinidad and Tobago
 : 
 : 
 : 
 4th: 
7–25 March: 2018 South American Under-17 Women's Football Championship in  Argentina
: 
: 
: 
4th: 
19–22 April; 6–12 June: 2018 CONCACAF Women's U-17 Championship in  Nicaragua and the 
 On 22 April 2018, four days into the tournament, CONCACAF announced the remainder of the championship was cancelled immediately due to security concerns caused by civil unrest in Nicaragua. The tournament resumed on 6 June and concluded on 12 June, with the remainder of the tournament played at the IMG Academy in Bradenton, Florida, United States.
: 
: 
: 
4th: 
 1–13 May: 2018 AFF U-16 Girls' Championship in  Palembang
: 
: 
: 
4th: 
9–21 May: 2018 UEFA Women's Under-17 Championship in  Lithuania
: 
: 
: 
4th: 
5–10 June: 2018 Sud Ladies Cup in  France
: 
: 
: 
4th: 
18–30 July: 2018 UEFA Women's Under-19 Championship in  Switzerland
: 
: 
7–24 August: 2018 FIFA U-20 Women's World Cup in  France
: 
: 
: 
4th: 
20 November – 1 December: 2018 FIFA U-17 Women's World Cup in  Uruguay
: 
: 
: 
4th:

News 
 27 April – The U.S. NCAA tabled (placed on hold) a proposal passed in March by its soccer rules committee, which governs both men's and women's play, that would have called for the NCAA to adopt FIFA rules regarding timekeeping, with the official time being kept on the field by the referee and stadium clocks counting up instead of down. This means that the existing timekeeping system, with the official time being maintained by a visible, downward-counting clock, will remain in place.

Fixed dates for national team matches 

Scheduled international matches per their International Match Calendar. Also known as FIFA International Day/Date(s).
19–27 March
3–11 September
8–16 October
12–20 November

Club continental champions

Men

Women

Domestic leagues

UEFA

AFC

CAF

CONCACAF

CONMEBOL

OFC

Domestic cups
In all tables in this section, the "last honor" refers to the champion's previous win in that specific cup competition.

AFC

UEFA

CAF

CONCACAF

CONMEBOL

Women's leagues

UEFA

AFC

CONCACAF

CONMEBOL

Women's cups

UEFA

Detailed association football results

FIFA
 14 June – 15 July: 2018 FIFA World Cup in 
  defeated , 4–2, to win their second FIFA World Cup title.  took third place.
 5 – 24 August: 2018 FIFA U-20 Women's World Cup in 
  defeated , 3–1, to win their first FIFA U-20 Women's World Cup title.
  took third place.
 13 November – 1 December: 2018 FIFA U-17 Women's World Cup in 
  defeated , 2–1, to win their first FIFA U-17 Women's World Cup title.
  took third place.
 12 – 22 December: 2018 FIFA Club World Cup in the 
  Real Madrid C.F. defeated  Al Ain FC, 4–1, to win their third consecutive and fourth overall FIFA Club World Cup title.
  River Plate took third place.

World Elite Club Friendlies
 10 – 20 January: 2018 Florida Cup in the 
 Champions:  Atlético Nacional; Second:  Barcelona S.C.; Third:  Rangers F.C.
 20 July – 11 August: 2018 International Champions Cup
 Champions:  Tottenham Hotspur F.C.; Second:  Borussia Dortmund; Third:  Inter Milan

Women's World Elite Club Friendlies
 26 – 29 July: 2018 Women's International Champions Cup in the 
  North Carolina Courage defeated  Olympique Lyonnais, 1–0, to win their 1st Women's International Champions Cup. 
  Manchester City took third place and  Paris SG took fourth place.

UEFA
Clubs teams
 27 June 2017 – 26 May: 2017–18 UEFA Champions League (final in  Kyiv)
  Real Madrid C.F. defeated  Liverpool F.C., 3–1, to win their third consecutive and thirteenth overall UEFA Champions League title.
 Note: Real Madrid would represent UEFA at the 2018 FIFA Club World Cup.
 29 June 2017 – 16 May: 2017–18 UEFA Europa League (final in  Décines-Charpieu)
  Atlético Madrid defeated  Marseille, 3–0, to win their third UEFA Europa League title.
 22 August 2017 – 24 May: 2017–18 UEFA Women's Champions League (final in  Kyiv)
  Lyon defeated  Wolfsburg, 4–1 at extra time, to win their third consecutive and fifth overall UEFA Women's Champions League title.
 12 September 2017 – 23 April: 2017–18 UEFA Youth League (final in  Nyon)
  Barcelona defeated  Chelsea, 3–0, to win their second UEFA Youth League title.
 15 August: 2018 UEFA Super Cup in  Tallinn
  Atlético Madrid defeated fellow Spanish team, Real Madrid C.F., 4–2 in extra time, to win their third UEFA Super Cup title.

National teams
 31 August 2017 – 27 March: 2017–18 Under 20 Elite League
 Champions: ; Second: ; Third: 
 4 – 20 May: 2018 UEFA European Under-17 Championship in 
  defeated , 4–1 in penalties and after a 2–2 score in regular play, to win their third UEFA European Under-17 Championship title.
 9 – 21 May: 2018 UEFA Women's Under-17 Championship in 
  defeated , 2–0, to win their fourth UEFA Women's Under-17 Championship title.
  took third place.
 Note: All teams mentioned here have qualified to compete at the 2018 FIFA U-17 Women's World Cup.
 16 – 29 July: 2018 UEFA European Under-19 Championship in 
  defeated , 4–3 at extra time, to win their fourth UEFA European Under-19 Championship title.
 18 – 30 July: 2018 UEFA Women's Under-19 Championship in 
  defeated , 1–0, to win their second consecutive and third overall UEFA Women's Under-19 Championship title.
 6 September – 20 November: 2018–19 UEFA Nations League Group Stage (debut event)

CONCACAF
 18 – 28 January: 2018 CONCACAF Women's U-20 Championship in 
  took third place.
 Note: All teams mentioned here have qualified to compete at the 2018 FIFA U-20 Women's World Cup.
 31 January – 16 May: 2018 Caribbean Club Championship
  Club Franciscain defeated  Central F.C., 2–1, to win their place at the 2018 CONCACAF League.
 20 February – 26 April: 2018 CONCACAF Champions League
  C.D. Guadalajara defeated  Toronto FC, 4–2 in penalties and after a score of 3–3 in a 2-legged format, to win their second CONCACAF Champions League title.
 Note: Guadalajara would represent CONCACAF at the 2018 FIFA Club World Cup.
 19 – 29 April: 2018 CONCACAF Women's U-17 Championship in 
 Note: Event cancelled midway through the tournament, due to violent protests that led to the killing of 25 people over social security issues.
 6 – 12 June: Continuing of the 2018 CONCACAF Women's U-17 Championship in  Bradenton, Florida
  defeated , 3–2, to win their second consecutive and fourth overall CONCACAF Women's U-17 Championship title.
  took third place.
 Note: All teams mentioned above have qualified to compete at the 2018 FIFA U-17 Women's World Cup.
 31 July – 1 November: 2018 CONCACAF League
  C.S. Herediano defeated  F.C. Motagua, 3–2 on aggregate, to win their first CONCACAF League title.
 15 – 22 August: 2018 CONCACAF Champions League U13
  LAFC defeated  Juniors Tampico, 2–0, to win their first CONCACAF Champions League U13 title.
 19 – 26 August: 2018 UNCAF U-19 Tournament in  Comayagua and Siguatepeque
 Round Robin: 1. , 2. , 3. , 4. 
 3 September 2018 – 31 March 2020: 2019–20 CONCACAF Nations League (debut event)
 19 September: 2018 Campeones Cup in  Toronto (debut event)
  UANL defeated  Toronto FC, 3–1, to win the inaugural Campeones Cup.
 20 – 27 October: 2018 UNCAF U-16 Tournament in  Santa Catarina Pinula
 Round Robin: 1. , 2. , 3. , 4.

Other tournaments
 26 July – 2 August: 2018 Tournament of Nations in 
 Champions: ; Second: ; Third: ; Fourth:

AFC
 22 December 2017 – 5 January: 23rd Arabian Gulf Cup in 
 In the final,  defeated , 5–4 in penalties and after a 0–0 score in regular play, to win their second Arabian Gulf Cup title.
 9 – 27 January: 2018 AFC U-23 Championship in 
 In the final,  defeated , 2–1, after extra time, to win their 1st AFC U-23 Championship.  took third place.
 16 January – 10 November: 2018 AFC Champions League
  Kashima Antlers  won their first AFC Champions League title after victory against their Competitors at ACL.
 Note: Kashima Antlers would represent the AFC at the 2018 FIFA Club World Cup.
 22 January – 27 October: 2018 AFC Cup
  Al-Quwa Al-Jawiya defeated  Altyn Asyr FK, 2–0, to win their third consecutive AFC Cup title.
 6 – 20 April: 2018 AFC Women's Asian Cup in 
  defeated , 1–0, to win their second AFC Women's Asian Cup title.
  took third place.
 1 – 13 May: 2018 AFF U-16 Girls' Championship in  Palembang
 In the final,  defeated , 1–0, to win their 2nd AFF U-16 Girls' Championship.  took third place.
 30 June – 13 July: 2018 AFF Women's Championship in  Palembang
  defeated , 3–2, to win their third consecutive and fourth overall AFF Women's Championship title.
  took third place.
 1 – 14 July: 2018 AFF U-19 Youth Championship in  Gresik & Sidoarjo
  defeated , 4–3, to win their first AFF U-19 Youth Championship title.
  took third place.
 29 July – 11 August: 2018 AFF U-16 Youth Championship in  Gresik & Sidoarjo
  defeated , 4–3 in penalties and after a 1–1 score in regular play, to win their first AFF U-16 Youth Championship title.
  took third place.
 4 – 15 September: 2018 SAFF Championship in 
  defeated , 2–1, to win their second SAFF Championship title.
 20 September – 7 October: 2018 AFC U-16 Championship in 
  defeated , 1–0, to win their third AFC U-16 Championship title.
 1 – 12 October: 2018 Bangabandhu Cup in 
  defeated , 4–3 in penalties and after a 0–0 score in regular play, to win their first Bangabandhu Cup title.
 4 – 8 October: 2018 Yongchuan International Tournament in  Chongqing
 1st. , 2nd. , 3rd. , 4th.  
 7 October and November: 2018 / Saudi-Egyptian Super Cup in  Riyadh
  Zamalek SC defeated  Al-Hilal FC, 2–1, to win their 1st title.
 18 October – 4 November: 2018 AFC U-19 Championship in 
  defeated , 2–1, to win their third AFC U-19 Championship title.
 Note: Both Saudi Arabia and South Korea, along with  & , have qualified to compete at the 2019 FIFA U-20 World Cup.
 8 November – 15 December: 2018 AFF Championship
  defeated , 3–2 on aggregate, to win their second AFF Championship title. 
 23 November – 1 December: 2018 CAFA Women's Championship in  Tashkent
 Champions: ; Second: ; Third: ; Fourth: ; Fifth:

CAF
 13 January – 4 February: 2018 African Nations Championship in 
  defeated , 4–0, to win their first African Nations Championship title.
  took third place.
 24 February: 2018 CAF Super Cup in  Casablanca
 In the final,  Wydad Casablanca defeated  TP Mazembe, 1–0, to win their third CAF Super Cup.
 14 – 29 April: 2018 CECAFA U-17 Championship in  Ngozi, Muyinga & Gitega
  defeated , 2–0, to win their first CECAFA U-17 Championship title.
  took third place.
 9 February – 2 December: 2018 CAF Confederation Cup
  Raja defeated  AS Vita Club, 4–3 on aggregate, to win their second CAF Confederation Cup title.
 10 February – 9 November: 2018 CAF Champions League
  Espérance de Tunis defeated  Al Ahly, 4–3 on aggregate (2 matches), to win their third CAF Champions League title.
 Note: Espérance de Tunis would represent CAF at the 2018 FIFA Club World Cup.
 29 June – 13 July: 2018 Kagame Interclub Cup in  Dar es Salaam
  Azam defeated  Simba, 2–1, to win their second Kagame Interclub Cup title.
  Gor Mahia took third place.
 23 – 27 July: 2018 CECAFA Women's Championship in 
 Round Robin Final Ranking: 1. , 2. , 3. , 4. 
 12 – 22 September: 2018 COSAFA Women's Championship in 
  defeated , 2–1, to win their fifth COSAFA Women's Championship title.
  took third place.

CONMEBOL
 13 – 31 January: 2018 South American Under-20 Women's Football Championship in 
  defeated , 8–1, to win their eighth consecutive South American Under-20 Women's Football Championship title.
  took third place.
 Note: Brazil and Paraguay both qualified to compete at the 2018 FIFA U-20 Women's World Cup.
 22 January – 9 December: 2018 Copa Libertadores
 Note: First leg took place in Buenos Aires on 11 November. Second leg took place in Madrid on 9 December.
  River Plate defeated fellow Argentinian team, Boca Juniors, 5–3 on aggregate, to win their fourth Copa Libertadores title.
 10 – 24 February: 2018 U-20 Copa Libertadores in 
  Nacional defeated  Independiente del Valle, 2–1, to win their first U-20 Copa Libertadores title.
  River Plate took third place.
 13 February – 12 December: 2018 Copa Sudamericana
  Atlético Paranaense defeated  Junior, 4–3 in penalties and after a 2–2 score in regular play on aggregate, to win their first Copa Sudamericana title.
 14 & 21 February: 2018 Recopa Sudamericana
  Grêmio defeated  Independiente, 5–4 in penalties after tying each other twice in regular play, to win their second Recopa Sudamericana title.
 7 – 25 March: 2018 South American Under-17 Women's Football Championship in 
 Champions: ; Second: ; Third: 
 Note: All three teams here have qualified to compete at the 2018 FIFA U-17 Women's World Cup.
 4 – 22 April: 2018 Copa América Femenina in 
 Champions: ; Second: ; Third: ; Fourth: 
 Note 1: Brazil has qualified to compete at the 2019 FIFA Women's World Cup and the 2020 Summer Olympics.
 Note 2: Chile has qualified to compete at the 2019 FIFA Women's World Cup and has a place at the 2020 CAF–CONMEBOL play-off.
 Note 3: Argentina has qualified to compete at the 2019 Pan American Games and has a place at the World Cup CONCACAF–CONMEBOL play-off.
 Note 4: Colombia has qualified to compete at the 2019 Pan American Games.
 8 August: 2018 Suruga Bank Championship in  Osaka
  Independiente defeated  Cerezo Osaka, 1–0, to win their first Suruga Bank Championship title.
 18 November – 2 December: 2018 Copa Libertadores Femenina in  Manaus
  Atlético Huila defeated  Santos, 5–3 on penalties and after a 1–1 score in regular play, to win their first Copa Libertadores Femenina title.
  Iranduba took third place.

Other tournaments
 30 November: Copa RS U20 in  Porto Alegre

OFC
 10 February – 20 May: 2018 OFC Champions League
  Team Wellington defeated  Lautoka F.C., 10–3 on aggregate (two matches played), to win their first OFC Champions League title.
 Note: Team Wellington would represent the OFC at the 2018 FIFA Club World Cup.
 5 – 18 August: 2018 OFC U-19 Championship in 
  defeated , 1–0, to win their 7th OFC U-19 Championship title.
 Note: New Zealand and Tahiti qualified for the 2019 FIFA U-20 World Cup.
 9 – 22 September: 2018 OFC U-16 Championship in 
  defeated , 0–0 (5–4 on penalties), to win their seven consecutive and eighth overall OFC U-16 Championship title.
 Note: New Zealand and Solomon Islands qualified for the 2019 FIFA U-17 World Cup.
 18 November – 1 December: 2018 OFC Women's Nations Cup in 
  defeated , 8–0, to win their fourth consecutive and sixth overall OFC Women's Nations Cup title.
  took third place.
 Note: New Zealand has qualified to compete at the 2019 FIFA Women's World Cup and the 2020 Summer Olympics.

Detailed beach soccer results

BSWW events
 27 – 29 January: Persian Beach Soccer Cup 2018 in  Bushehr
 Champions: ; Second: ; Third: ; Fourth: 
 3 – 10 March: Copa America de Futbol Playa 2018 in  El Boulevard de Asia
 Champions: ; Second: ; Third: ; Fourth: 
 29 – 31 March: Copa Centroamericana de Fútbol Playa 2018 in  San Luis La Herradura
 Champions: ; Second: ; Third: ; Fourth: 
 6 – 8 April: BSWW Tour - CFA Belt and Road International Beach Soccer Cup 2018 in  Haikou
 Champions: ; Second: ; Third: ; Fourth: 
 15 – 17 April: Eurasia Beach Soccer Cup 2018 in  Yazd
 Champions:  Lokomotiv BSC; Second:  Moghavemat Golsapoosh; Third:  Levante UD; Fourth:  Catania BS
 27 – 29 April: BSWW Tour - Bahamas Beach Soccer Cup 2018 in  Nassau
 Champions: ; Second: ; Third: ; Fourth: 
 25 – 27 May: Nazaré Beach Soccer Cup 2018 in 
 Group H Teams: 1)  Artur Music; 2)  Catania BS; 3)  BSC Kristall; 4)  Viareggio BS 
 Group I Teams: 1)  Falfala Kfar Qassem; 2)  Playas de Mazarrón; 3)  Casa Benfica de Loures; 4)  Boca Gdansk
 28 May – 3 June: 2018 Euro Winners Cup for Men and Women in  Nazaré
 Men's Champions:  S.C. Braga; Second:  BSC Kristall; Third:  KP Łódź
 Women's Champions:  WFC Zvezda Women; Second:  Portsmouth Ladies BSC; Third:  AIFS Playas de San Javier Women
 8 – 10 June: NASSC - US Open 2018 in  Virginia Beach
 For detailed results, click here.
 15 – 17 June: BSWW Mundialito Almada 2018 in 
 Champions: ; Second: ; Third: ; Fourth: 
 15 – 17 June: Talent Beach Soccer Cup 2018 in  Siófok
 Champions: ; Second: ; Third: ; Fourth: 
 6 – 8 July: Women's Euro Beach Soccer Cup Nazaré 2018 in 
  defeated , 2–0, in the final.  took third place.
 13 – 15 July: Morocco Beach Soccer Cup Agadir 2018 in 
 Champions: ; Second: ; Third: ; Fourth: 
 17 – 19 August: Balaton Beach Soccer Cup 2018 in  Siófok
 Champions: ; Second: ; Third: ; Fourth: 
 17 – 19 August: BSWW Tour - Goalfun CFA China-Latin America Beach Soccer Championship Tangshan 2018 in 
 Champions: ; Second: ; Third: ; Fourth: 
 5 – 7 October: Alanya Beach Soccer Cup 2018 in 
 Champions:  BSC Lokomotiv Moscow; Second:  Sporting CP; Third:  Levante UD; Fourth:  Alanya Belediye Spor
 6 – 10 November: Huawei Intercontinental Beach Soccer Cup Dubai 2018 in 
 Champions: ; Second: ; Third: 
 8 – 14 December: 2018 CAF Beach Soccer Africa Cup of Nations - Egypt in  Sharm El Sheikh
  defeated , 6–1, in the final.  took third place.

2018 Euro Beach Soccer League
 22 – 24 June: EBSL #1 in  Baku
 Winners:  (Division A - Group 1) /  (Division A - Group 2)
 6 – 8 July: EBSL #2 in  Nazaré
 Winners:  (Division A);  (Division B - Group 1) /  (Division B - Group 2)
 20 – 22 July: ESBL #3 in  Moscow
 Winners:  (Division A);  (Division B)
 3 – 5 August: ESBL #4 in  Minsk
 Winners: 
 24 – 26 August: ESBL #5 in  Warnemünde
 Winners:  (Division A);  (Division B)
 6 – 9 September: Euro Beach Soccer League Superfinal & Promotion Final in  Alghero
 Superfinal:  defeated , 7–6 in penalties and after a 2–2 score in regular play, to win their second Euro Beach Soccer League title.
  took third place.
 Promotion:  defeated , 4–3 in penalties and after a 4–4 score in regular play, in the final.

Detailed futsal results

AFC
 1 – 11 February: 2018 AFC Futsal Championship in 
 In the final,  defeated , 4–0, to win their 12th AFC Futsal Championship.  took third place and  took fourth place.
 2 – 12 May: 2018 AFC Women's Futsal Championship in 
 In the final,  defeated , 5–2, to win their 2nd AFC Women Futsal Championship.  took third place and  took fourth place.

CONMEBOL
 22 – 29 April: 2018 Copa Libertadores de Futsal in  Carlos Barbosa
 In the final,  Carlos Barbosa defeated  Joinville, 4–1, to win their 5th Copa Libertadores de Futsal.  Magnus Sorocaba Futsal-Athleta took third place and  Cerro Porteño took fourth place.

UEFA
 30 January – 10 February: UEFA Futsal Euro 2018 in  Ljubljana
 In the final,  defeated , 3–2, after extra time, to win their 1st UEFA Futsal Euro.  took third place and  took fourth place.
 26 – 29 March: 2nd European Women's Futsal Tournament in  Drachten
 In the final,  Atlético Navalcarnero defeated  Benfica, 5–2, to win their second consecutive women's tournament.  Olimpus Key Partner Roma took third place and  SC MosPolitech took fourth place.
 20 – 22 April: 2017–18 UEFA Futsal Cup (Final Four) in  Zaragoza
 In the final,  Inter FS defeated  Sporting CP, 5–2,  to win their 5th UEFA Futsal Cup.  FC Barcelona took third place and  Győri ETO took fourth place.

CAF
Other competitions
 16 – 18 March: 1st International Futsal Tournament Mauritius 2018 in  Vacoas-Phoenix
 Winners: , 2nd place: , 3rd place: , 4th place:

World
 29 January – 4 February: 2018 Grand Prix de Futsal in  Brusque
 In the final,  defeated , 4–2, to win their 10th Grand Prix de Futsal.  took third place and  took fourth place.
 19 – 26 August: 16th World University Futsal Championships in  Almaty
 In the final,  defeated , 4–2.  took third place and  took fourth place.

Deaths

January 

 1 January 
 Gert Brauer, 62, German footballer
 Régis Manon, 52, Gabonese footballer
 Dušan Mitošević, 68, Serbian football player
 2 January
 Alan Deakin, 76, English footballer
 Eugène Gerards, 77, Dutch football player
 Ali Kadhim, 69, Iraqi football player
 Mike McCartney, 63, Scottish footballer
 Michael Pfeiffer, 92, German football player
 Felix Reilly, 84, Scottish footballer
 3 January 
 Darci Miguel Monteiro, 49, Brazilian footballer
 Igor Strelbin, 43, Russian footballer
 4 January
 Peter Birdseye, 98, English footballer
 Papa Camara, 66, Guinean football player
 Joaquín Cortizo, 85, Spanish footballer
 5 January – Antonio Valentín Angelillo, 80, Italian-Argentine football player
 6 January – Nigel Sims, 86, English footballer
 8 January
 Hans Aabech, 69, Danish footballer
 Juan Carlos García, 29, Honduran footballer
 Antonio Munguía, 75, Mexican footballer
 9 January
 Tommy Lawrence, 77, Scottish footballer
 Valeri Matyunin, 57, Russian footballer
 Ted Phillips, 84, English footballer
 Kurt Thalmann, 86, Swiss footballer
 10 January
 Pierre Grillet, 85, French footballer
 John McGlashan, 50, Scottish footballer
 Gordon Wills, 83, English footballer
 11 January
 Raúl Antonio García, 55, Salvadoran footballer
 Takis Loukanidis, 80, Greek footballer
 Giuseppe Secchi, 86, Italian footballer
 12 January – Léon Ritzen (nl), 78, Belgian footballer
 13 January – Mohammed Hazzaz, 72, Moroccan footballer
 14 January
 Anton Regh, 77, German footballer
 Cyrille Regis, 59, English footballer
 15 January
 Carl Emil Christiansen, 80, Danish footballer
 Bogusław Cygan, 53, Polish footballer
 16 January
 Rubén Oswaldo Díaz, 72, Argentine footballer
 Rodney Fern, 69, English footballer
 19 January – Abdulsalam Musa, 39, Nigerian footballer

 21 January 
 Philippe Gondet, 75, French footballer
 Tsukasa Hosaka, 80, Japanese footballer
 22 January
 Jimmy Armfield, 82, English football player
 Reinier Kreijermaat, 82, Dutch footballer
 25 January – Keith Pring, 74, Welsh footballer
 27 January – Göran Nicklasson, 75, Swedish footballer
 30 January
 Vic Keeble, 87, English footballer
 Azeglio Vicini, 84, Italian football player and National Team coach 
 31 January – Hennie Hollink, 86, Dutch footballer

February

 2 February 
 Paulo Roberto Morais Júnior, 33, Brazilian footballer
 Fábio Pereira de Azevedo, 41, Brazilian-born Togolese footballer
 3 February – Károly Palotai, 82, Hungarian football player and referee
 4 February – Majid Ariff, 80, Singaporean football player and coach
 5 February – Ladislav Kačáni, 86, Slovak football player and coach
 9 February – Liam Miller, 36, Irish footballer
 10 February – Dick Scott, 76, English footballer
 12 February – Mogau Tshehla, 26, South African footballer
 13 February 
 Joseph Bonnel, 79, French footballer
 Danilo Caçador, 32, Brazilian footballer
 Luis Cid, 88, Spanish football coach
 16 February
 Hans Rinner, 54, Austrian businessman and football official
 Muhammet Yürükuslu, 26, Turkish footballer
 17 February – Peder Persson, 79, Swedish footballer
 18 February
 Pavel Panov, 67, Bulgarian football player and coach
 Chinedu Udoji, 28, Nigerian footballer
 20 February
 Lucien Bouchardeau, 56, Nigerien football referee
 Georgi Markov, 46, Bulgarian footballer
 21 February
 Sergei Aleksandrov, 44, Russian footballer
 Chow Chee Keong, 69, Malaysian footballer
 22 February
 Bence Lázár, 26, Hungarian footballer
 Billy Wilson, 71, English footballer
 25 February
 Branko Kubala, 69, Czechoslovak-born Spanish footballer
 Henri Leonetti, 81, French footballer
 Tsvetan Veselinov, 70, Bulgarian footballer
 27 February – Quini (Enrique Castro González), 68, Spanish footballer
 28 February
 Kieron Durkan, 44, English footballer
 John Muir, 70, Scottish footballer

March

 1 March – Vicente Piquer, 83, Spanish footballer and coach
 3 March – Arthur Stewart, 76, Northern Irish footballer
 4 March – Davide Astori, 31, Italian footballer
 5 March
 Shaker Al-Olayan, 46, Saudi Arabian footballer 
 Costakis Koutsokoumnis, 61, Cypriot football administrator
 6 March
 Francis Piasecki, 66, French footballer
 Vitaliy Zub, 89, Ukrainian footballer
 7 March – John Molyneux, 87, English football player
 9 March – Ion Voinescu, 88, Romanian footballer
 14 March – Rubén Galván 65, Argentine football player
 16 March
 Boyukagha Hajiyev, 59, Azerbaijani footballer and manager
 Ezequiel Orozco, 29, Mexican footballer
 Adrian Lillebekk Ovlien, 20, Norwegian footballer
 22 March – René Houseman, 64, Argentine footballer

April
 
 2 April
 Elie Onana, 66, Cameroonian footballer
 Paul Sinibaldi, 96, French footballer
 4 April – Ray Wilkins, 61, English football player, heart attack
 8 April
 António Barros, 68, Portuguese footballer
André Lerond, 87, French footballer
 13 April – Cesarino Cervellati, 88, Italian football player and manager

May
 15 May – Jlloyd Samuel, 37, English-Trinidadian footballer
 18 May – Doğan Babacan, 88, Turkish referee

June
 18 June – Walter Bahr, 91, American soccer player

July
 8 July – Alan Gilzean, 79, Scottish footballer
 14 July – Davie McParland, 83, Scottish footballer and manager
 21 July – Allan Ball, 75, English footballer

August

September
 24 September – Jim Brogan, 74, Scottish footballer

October
 18 October – Darren Stewart, 52, Australian soccer player and manager
 21 October – Ilie Balaci, 62, Romanian footballer and manager
 27 October – Vichai Srivaddhanaprabha, 60, Thai businessman and owner of Leicester City F.C., helicopter crash
 31 October – Johnny Graham, 73, Scottish footballer.

November
 13 November
William Mullan, 90, Scottish football referee.
David Stewart, 71, Scottish footballer.
 16 November – Flemming Nielsen, 84, Danish footballer
 19 November – George Yardley, 76, Scottish footballer
 22 November – Len Campbell, 71, Scottish footballer

December
 25 December – Sigi Schmid, 65, American manager 
 27 December – Juan Bautista Agüero, 83, Paraguayan footballer

References

External links 

 
Association football by year
2018 sport-related lists